Sigcau is a South African surname that may refer to

 Botha Sigcau (died 1978), King in the  Eastern Pondoland, President of Transkei from 1976 to 1978 and grandson of Sigcau
 Nkosi Ntsikayezwe Sigcau (1947–1996), atraditional leader of Lwandlolubomvu Traditional Council, the youngest son of King Botha Sigcau, brother to Princess Stella Sigcau and descendant of Sigcau
 Stella Sigcau (1937–2006), Mpondo Princess, Minister in the South African Government;  the first and the desce only female Prime Minister of Transkei, and descendant of Sigcau

Xhosa-language surnames